Karl Solomon Te Nana (born 15 July 1975) is a New Zealand former rugby union and rugby league footballer, and currently works in broadcasting as a rugby commentator.

A professional rugby union player, Te Nana won a gold medal as part of the New Zealand rugby sevens national team at the 2002 Commonwealth Games. He scored 113 tries for the New Zealand rugby sevens team. He was the leading try scorer during the 2000–01 Sevens Series with 42 tries. He was a member of the New Zealand squad that won the 2001 Rugby World Cup Sevens.

He played for North Harbour in the National Provincial Championship and spent the 2000 season with the Otago Highlanders in Super Rugby (then known as the Super 12).

He played for the Point Chevalier Pirates in the Auckland Rugby League's Phelan Shield.

In 2019, he was on the first panel to determine the World Rugby women's-15s player-of-the-year award with Melodie Robinson, Danielle Waterman, Will Greenwood, Liza Burgess, Lynne Cantwell, Fiona Coghlan, Gaëlle Mignot, Jillion Potter, and Stephen Jones.

Television
Now retired, Te Nana hosted a weekly rugby show on Sky TV in New Zealand called "This Given Sunday" with former All Black halfback Steve Devine. 
Also a regular world rugby commentator on the 7's World Series for both men's and woman's.    He hosts, reports and commentates on All Blacks, Super Rugby, college rugby and provincial rugby for Sky TV in New Zealand.

References

1975 births
Living people
Chiefs (rugby union) players
Commonwealth Games gold medallists for New Zealand
Commonwealth Games medallists in rugby sevens
Commonwealth Games rugby sevens players of New Zealand
New Zealand international rugby sevens players
New Zealand male rugby sevens players
New Zealand rugby league players
New Zealand rugby union players
North Harbour rugby union players
People educated at Te Aute College
Point Chevalier Pirates players
Rugby league players from Palmerston North
Rugby sevens players at the 2002 Commonwealth Games
Rugby union players from Palmerston North
Medallists at the 2002 Commonwealth Games